Vernon Township is one of twelve townships in Humboldt County, Iowa, USA. As of the 2000 census, its population was 530.

Geography

Cities, towns, villages
Renwick
Lu Verne

Adjacent townships
 Lu Verne Township, Kossuth County (north)
 Magor Township, Hancock County (northeast)
 Boone Township, Wright County (east)
 Liberty Township, Wright County (southeast)
 Lake Township (south)
 Grove Township (southwest)
 Humboldt Township (west)
 Sherman Township, Kossuth County (northwest)

Political districts
 Iowa's 4th congressional district
 State House District 4

Cemeteries
The township contains Swiss Cemetery and Vernon Township Cemetery.

References
 United States Census Bureau 2008 TIGER/Line Shapefiles
 United States Board on Geographic Names (GNIS)
 United States National Atlas

External links
 US-Counties.com
 City-Data.com

Townships in Humboldt County, Iowa
Populated places established in 1865
Townships in Iowa